Samrong Thap railway station is a railway station located in Pradu Subdistrict, Samrong Thap District, Surin Province.

References 

Railway stations in Thailand
Surin province